The Men's 50 km Walk event at the 2001 World Championships was held on Saturday August 11, 2001 in Edmonton, Alberta, Canada.

Medalists

Abbreviations
All times shown are in hours:minutes:seconds

Records

Startlist

Intermediates

Final ranking

References
 IAAF results
 Results

W
Racewalking at the World Athletics Championships